Antony Warmbold (born 28 July 1978) is a former German rally driver. He competed full-time in the World Rally Championship between 2003 and 2005, scoring seven points.

Career
Antony is the son of former rally driver Achim Warmbold. Antony was co-driver for his father before switching to driving. In 2001 he contested three rounds of the World Rally Championship - two in a Toyota Corolla WRC and one in a Toyota Celica GT-Four.  In 2002 he took part in the European Rally Championship, finishing seventh in the standings.

For 2003 he completed a deal to use a Ford Focus RS WRC on 12 of the 14 rallies on the WRC calendar. He scored a best finish of 11th on the first event of the season, the Monte Carlo Rally. In 2004 he entered all 16 rallies in a Focus, finishing eighth on Rally Turkey, Rally Japan and Rally d'Italia Sardegna. In 2005 he took part in all but one of the 16 rallies in a Focus RS WRC 04 entered by the Ford World Rally Team. He finished seventh three times; in Mexico, Italy and Spain. In 2006 Warmbold quit rallying after running out of funds.

WRC results

References

External links
WRC behind the stages - Antony's blog

Living people
1978 births
German rally drivers
World Rally Championship drivers